Trick skiing is a type of skiing where stunts are performed on skis.  It may refer to:

Freestyle skiing, when the tricks are performed on snow
Waterskiing, when the tricks are performed on water

Skiing